Surloti or Sourloti is a rock in the Meteora rock formation complex of Thessaly, Greece.

The Monastery of St. Eustratius (Moni Agios Efstratios, Μονή Αγίου Ευστρατίου) is a little-known monastery on Surloti Rock (βράχου Σουρλωτή).

References

Rocks of Meteora
Former Christian monasteries in Greece